Triantafyllia may refer to the following places in Greece:

Triantafyllia, Florina, a village in Florina municipality
Triantafyllia, Serres, a village in Visaltia municipality